Kalathimadam is a village near Alangulam in Tenkasi district of Tamil Nadu, India.The Village derives its name from the Kalathivinayagar Temple which is located in the Village.The Village is located at a distance of about 1.7 km from the Alangulam. The village is well connected to alangulam through Mini bus service.

Employment

This village has a number of people involved in agriculture, however now agriculture in this area is decreasing.  This place is noted for the self-employed beedi workers.  Most of the women are involved in beedi making.  No major factory is available around this village.  Daily wages is one of the main income for people. Totally 50 tractors workings for form. In this area well building work is famous. 20 well making machine herem

Utilities and facilities

Temples

 Kalathi Vinayagar Alayam
 Amman Kovil
 Thalavai Sudalaimadan Thirukovil
 Nochiyadi Sudalai Madan Kovil
 THUSIMADASAMY KOVIL
 Ayya Vaikundasamy Koil 
 Church of South India Church
 faith church of god (CHURCH)

No of Teams
Black Rose Friends

Friends Cricket Club

Mass Royal Friends

Nadar Cricket Club

Love Star Group

External links
 http://indiapincode.in/kalathimadam
 http://www.indiastudychannel.com/India/cities/83954-Kalathimadam.aspx

Villages in Tirunelveli district